This is a complete list of Paralympic competitors from Azerbaijan.

B
 Zeynidin Bilalov, athlete

I
 Ramin Ibrahimov, judoka

M
 Vugar Mehdiyev, athlete
 Akbar Muradov, shooter 
 Olokhan Musayev, athlete

P
 Oleg Panyutin, athlete
 Natali Pronina, swimmer

S
 Afag Sultanova, judoka

T
 Yelena Taranova, shooter

V
 Zinyat Valiyeva, archer

Z
 Ilham Zakiyev, judoka
 Vladimir Zayets, athlete

See also
 Azerbaijan at the Paralympics
 Paralympic Games

 
Paralympic competitors